, also known as Minuwangoda Nalanda Girls School, Nalanda Girls’ College, Minuwangoda or Nalanda College, Minuwangoda) is a girls madhya maha vidyalaya in Minuwangoda, Sri Lanka.

See also
Nalanda (Boys') Central College

References

External links
 Annual Assessment Camp of the Air Wing (Girls) Cadets of the National Cadet Corps

Girls' schools in Sri Lanka
National schools in Sri Lanka

Buddhist schools in Sri Lanka
Schools in Gampaha